In Greek mythology, Myrice is a minor figure from the island of Cyprus. Like both of her siblings Myrrha and Amaracus, she was transformed into a plant bearing her name.

Family 
She was the daughter of Cinyras, a king of Cyprus, and thus sister to Myrrha and Amaracus, thus aunt/half-sister to Adonis.

Mythology 
The mournful Myrice was transformed into a tamarix tree (myrike in Greek), possibly by Aphrodite, as the tamarisk was her sacred tree. Additionally, a Hellenistic and Roman-era cult dedicated to Myricaean Apollo ("Apollo of the Tamarisk") is attested on the Northeastern Aegean island of Lesbos.

See also 

 Melus
 Heliades
 Pelia

Notes

References

Bibliography 
 
 
 
 
 

Cypriot mythology
Women in Greek mythology
Metamorphoses into trees in Greek mythology
Family of Adonis